Dubey may refer to Doobay or Dube or Dwivedi as a Hindu surname. It may also refer to Dubey or Dube, a surname among some people of French origin.

Name
Some notable people with this name include:
 
 Abhay Kumar Dubey
 Bindeshwari Dubey
 Bodhram Dubey
 Chandra Shekhar Dubey
 Chandrashekhar Dubey
 Ira Dubey
 Lillete Dubey
 Lushin Dubey
 Muchkund Dubey
 Neha Dubey
 Nitin Dubey
 Nishikant Dubey
 Pradeep Dubey
 Praveen Dubey 
 Prem Ram Dubey
 Rajkumari Dubey
 Ravi Dubey
 Satyadev Dubey
 Satyajeet Dubey
 Satyendra Dubey
 Shivam Dubey
 Sourav Dubey
 Vikas Dubey

See also
 Indian names
 Dubey Schaldenbrand
 Dwivedi

Indian surnames